Denver Dell Pyle (May 11, 1920 – December 25, 1997) was an American film and television actor and director. He was well known for a number of TV roles from the 1960s through the 1980s, including his portrayal of Briscoe Darling Jr. in several episodes of The Andy Griffith Show, as Jesse Duke in The Dukes of Hazzard from 1979 to 1985, as Mad Jack in the NBC television series The Life and Times of Grizzly Adams, and as the titular character's father, Buck Webb, in CBS's The Doris Day Show. In many of his roles, he portrayed either authority figures, or gruff, demanding father figures, often as comic relief.
Perhaps his most memorable film role was that of Texas Ranger Frank Hamer in the movie Bonnie and Clyde (1967), as the lawman who relentlessly chased down and finally killed the notorious duo in an ambush.

Early life
Pyle was born in Bethune, Colorado on May 11, 1920, to farmer Ben H. Pyle and his wife Maude; His brother, Willis, was an animator known for his work with Walt Disney Animation Studios and UPA. After graduating from high school, Pyle briefly attended Colorado State University, but dropped out to enter show business, moving to Los Angeles in 1940. He worked as a drummer and band member until the United States entered World War II. His military service is unclear, and he possibly enlisted in the U.S. Navy or Merchant Marines, or both.

Career

After the war, Pyle embarked on his film and television career. He played many bit parts on television series and movies before starring in several movies and on television during the 1950s and '60s.

Limited roles
Pyle guest-starred 14 times between 1951 and 1953 on the syndicated television series The Range Rider with Jock Mahoney and Dick Jones, and appeared as an outlaw in a 1951 episode of the television series The Lone Ranger titled "Backtrail", episode 71 "The Outcast", episode 166 "Woman in the White Mask", and episode 187 "Cross of Santo Domingo".

In 1953, Pyle appeared on The Roy Rogers Show (season two, "Loaded Guns") as the wrongly accused killer, ranch hand Tom Larrabee. Also in 1953, Pyle played Emil Hatch in episode 46 of The Adventures of Superman entitled "Beware the Wrecker". He had a part in the 1955 Audie Murphy film To Hell and Back, and appeared twice on NBC's 1955–1956 Western anthology series Frontier (in "Mother of the Brave" and in "The Voyage of Captain Castle"). Pyle appeared twice as an unidentified bank robber in Duncan Renaldo's syndicated Western series The Cisco Kid. In 1954, he was cast as a henchman of the outlaw Sam Bass in Stories of the Century.

Pyle was twice cast on CBS's The Public Defender in the role of George Hansen, and three times on the religious anthology series, Crossroads on ABC. He acted the part of a police detective in the 1956 film noir Please Murder Me, starring Raymond Burr.

Pyle was cast as Carter in the 1955 episode "Joey's Father" on Fury. Three years later, he played an arsonist in the episode "The Fire Watchers" of the same series. In 1956, Pyle appeared as Vance Kiley in the episode called "Quicksand" in the TV Western series The Lone Ranger. That same year, he played "Willie Calhoun", a lovestruck, and soon-to-be murderer, in season 12's "Poor Pearl" on Gunsmoke. In 1958, Pyle starred with Judith Evelyn in the episode "Man in the Moon" of the NBC docudrama about the Cold War Behind Closed Doors, hosted by and occasionally starring Bruce Gordon.

He appeared as a professor in the syndicated Men into Space series' 1959 episode "Moonquake". In an episode of Ripcord, he played a suicidal parachutist. Also in 1959, he returned to Gunsmoke, playing the lead character Mike Blocker in the episode "The Bear".

Pyle appeared twice each on the CBS Western series My Friend Flicka and NBC's The Restless Gun with John Payne. He guest-starred with Grant Withers in the 1959 episode "Tumbleweed Ranger" of Tris Coffin's syndicated Western series 26 Men, billed as true stories of the Arizona Rangers. He appeared seven times on Richard Boone's CBS Western Have Gun – Will Travel; his final appearance was on the show in 1960 as the character Croft in "The Puppeteer".

He guest-starred in 1960 in several other Westerns, including Pony Express, The Man from Blackhawk, and Tombstone Territory. He guest-starred in the episode "Trail of the Dead", the story of five missing prospectors, of Rod Cameron's modern Western syndicated series State Trooper. He appeared with Sammy Jackson in the episode "Resurrection" of the syndicated American Civil War drama, The Gray Ghost. He was cast as Big Red in the 1959 episode "Woman in the River" of the ABC/Warner Bros. detective series Bourbon Street Beat, starring Andrew Duggan and Richard Long. He made several appearances as Briscoe Darling, Jr., on The Andy Griffith Show.

Pyle was cast in a number of Western movies by John Ford, including The Horse Soldiers with William Holden and The Man Who Shot Liberty Valance. He played a Tennessee soldier (called Thimblerig) in John Wayne's The Alamo (1960). He portrayed Sam Houston in several episodes of CBS's The Adventures of Jim Bowie. He guest-starred as a law-enforcement officer in Jim Davis' other syndicated series, Rescue 8, and also appeared in an episode of the ABC sitcom, The Real McCoys with Walter Brennan.

Pyle was cast in the 1960 episode "Three Wise Men" of ABC's Stagecoach West as an outlaw who promises to turn himself into the authorities if he can spend Christmas with his family. About this time, Pyle appeared in the segment "Lawyer in Petticoats" of William Bendix's 1960 NBC Western series Overland Trail with Doug McClure, and thereafter in 1961 in "Hand of Vengeance" in the syndicated Western series Two Faces West. Pyle was cast as Jed Corrigan in the 1961 episode "The Tramp" of the NBC family drama series National Velvet.

Pyle guest-starred twice on the CBS series Route 66 with Martin Milner and George Maharis, first in 1961 in the episode "The Newborn" and again in 1962 in "A Long Piece of Mischief". He appeared as the father of the doomed family in the dystopian episode "Black Leather Jackets" of The Twilight Zone.

In 1963, Pyle guest-starred on The Dick Van Dyke Show as Uncle George in the episode "Uncle George".

He appeared in the 1963–1964 season of ABC's drama about college life Channing. He portrayed the character Brill in the 1964 episode, "Johnny Ride the Pony: One, Two, Three", of the NBC education drama series, Mr. Novak, starring James Franciscus. Pyle appeared 14 times on Gunsmoke, seven times on Dick Powell's Zane Grey Theatre, and twice on Frontier Justice, all on CBS. He appeared in seven episodes as Ben Thompson (and twice as other characters) on the ABC Western series The Life and Legend of Wyatt Earp.

Pyle played frontier character Deadwood Dick in the 1966 episode "The Resurrection of Deadwood Dick" on the syndicated anthology series Death Valley Days.

He appeared twice in Cheyenne, starring Clint Walker. He played Sergeant Tripp in the episode "The Enemy" of the James Arness ABC series How the West Was Won. Pyle also had guest-starring roles on The Rifleman.

He also is known for portraying both the suspect and the murder victim on the last original Perry Mason TV episode, "The Case of the Final Fadeout", in 1966. He was one of 11 actors to hit the Perry Mason trifecta, portraying a victim, a defendant, and the actual murderer (in previous episodes) on the series, which he did in five appearances. Among his other appearances, he played defendant Robert Crane in "The Case of the Deadly Double" in 1958, Tom Quincy in "The Case of the Ominous Outcast" in 1960, murderer Tilden Stuart in "The Case of the Jealous Journalist", and murderer Emery Fillmore in "The Case of the Renegade Refugee" (both in 1961), and murderer Frank Honer in "The Case of the Shifty Shoebox" in 1963.

Pyle portrayed Grandpa Tarleton in all 26 episodes of Tammy in the 1965–1966 season. Pyle portrayed the vengeful Texas Ranger Frank Hamer in the 1967 movie Bonnie and Clyde. He also appeared in an episode of The High Chaparral as a general who had lost his son.

In 1968, he appeared as Titus Purcell, patriarch of a family of homesteaders, in the episode "The Price of Tomatoes" in the sitcom Gomer Pyle, U.S.M.C. Working for the first time with Jim Nabors playing Gomer Pyle, spun-off from The Andy Griffith Show, he used a screen persona similar to Briscoe Darling, Jr. In 1968, he also directed "The Great Diamond Mines" on Death Valley Days.

Pyle had a guest-starring role in 1973 on The Streets of San Francisco. In 1975, Walt Disney Productions released a film based on the novel Escape to Witch Mountain. In this film, Tony and Tia were played by Ike Eisenmann and Kim Richards, Lucas Deranian by Donald Pleasence, and the children's Uncle Bené by Pyle. In 1976, he appeared on Barnaby Jones in an episode titled "Stalking Horse". He appeared as a mayor residing in the town of Purgatory in the first-season episode of Kung Fu, titled "Ancient Warrior". He also appeared in second-season episode "Crossties" as a doctor. In 1985 (season 9, episode 8), Pyle made a guest appearance on The Love Boat.

Leading role
Pyle played the titular role in a theatrical film entitled Guardian of the Wilderness (1976) about Galen Clark, the true story of an explorer who persuaded Abraham Lincoln to have the Yosemite area set aside from commercial development, the original forerunner of the American national parks system. Clark was prompted by his decision to do all he could to preserve the Mariposa Grove of giant sequoias from being destroyed by loggers, along with the surrounding  land. Pyle was the top-billed lead in this theatrical motion picture shot on location. John Dehner portrayed legendary naturalist John Muir and Ford Rainey played President Lincoln. The movie is also known by its alternate title Mountain Man.

Continuing roles
One of Pyle's more endearing roles was that of Briscoe Darling, Jr., on The Andy Griffith Show (1960–1966). Pyle played the patriarch of the Darling family, a group of sons (all portrayed by The Dillards), and one daughter, Charlene, portrayed by Maggie Peterson. He appeared in seven episodes, six written by the comedy-writing team of Jim Fritzell and Everett Greenbaum.

Pyle played the role of Mad Jack in 36 episodes of the NBC series The Life and Times of Grizzly Adams (1977–1978). He played Buck Webb (Doris Day's television series father) during the first two seasons of CBS's The Doris Day Show (1968–1970). He said in 1968 that he based his acting in that role on his father's personality.

He did some writing and directing for the short-lived half-hour Western Dirty Sally starring Jeanette Nolan, which ran on CBS in the first half of 1974. He also played a small role on The Waltons as a relative of the Baldwin sisters.

Pyle's best-known and longest-running television role was that of Uncle Jesse Duke in the CBS series The Dukes of Hazzard (1979–1985) (146 episodes).

Later years
In his later life, Pyle played mostly cameo television roles and retired from full-time acting. His last film role was in the 1994 film Maverick. His last known acting role was as Jesse Duke in the 1997 CBS made-for-television movie The Dukes of Hazzard: Reunion!.

Charitable efforts
Pyle sponsored Uncle Jesse's Fishing Tournament in Lamar County, Texas. In 10 years of operation, the tournament raised more than $160,000 to support children's programs there. First established in 1988, the tournament is still going strong and celebrated its 30th anniversary in 2017. It continues to support the children's charities of Lamar County.

Recognition
Pyle has a star in the Motion Pictures section of the Hollywood Walk of Fame at 7083 Hollywood Boulevard. It was dedicated on December 12, 1997.

In 1991, the Texas Senate passed a resolution honoring Pyle and his wife for their work with Special Olympics and the Denver Pyle's Children's Charities.

Oil wealth
Within a few years of his final episode on The Andy Griffith Show, "The Darling Fortune", Pyle began investing in oil, buying oil wells thought to be near the end of their working lifetimes cheaply at a time when the price of oil was $2.15 per barrel. By 1981, after new technologies allowed the remaining oil to be more economically recovered from the wells and the 1973 oil crisis triggered a rise in prices to over $46 a barrel, he was very wealthy, having made much more money from oil than his total earnings in over 30 years as an actor. He said that he continued to work as an actor because "I look at it this way, acting provides the cash flow I need for oil speculation, and besides that I like acting. It's fun."

Personal life
In 1955, Pyle married Marilee Carpenter, a production assistant at 20th Century Fox. They had sons David and Tony. Marilee and Denver divorced in 1970. On 5 November 1983, Pyle married Tippie X. Johnston in Los Angeles County, California. That union lasted until his death.

Death
Pyle died of lung cancer on Christmas Day 1997. Memorial services were held January 6, 1998, at First Baptist Church in Waxahachie, Texas. He is buried in an unmarked grave at the Forreston Cemetery in Forreston, Texas. His remains are interred beside those of his second wife's parents, James Thomas Johnston and Erin Maurine (nee Birch) Johnston.

Selected filmography

The Guilt of Janet Ames (1947) as Masher (uncredited)
Devil Ship (1947) as Carl
Train to Alcatraz (1948) as Hutch Hutchins
Marshal of Amarillo (1948) as The Night Clerk
The Man from Colorado (1948) as Easy Jarrett (uncredited)
El Paso (1949) as Vigilante (uncredited)
Streets of San Francisco (1949) as Ed Quinn
Red Canyon (1949) as Hutch
Hellfire (1949) as Rex
Rim of the Canyon (1949) as Cash Collins (uncredited)
Too Late for Tears (1949) as Youth at Union Station (uncredited)
Flame of Youth (1949) as Lytz
The Big Wheel (1949) as Doctor
The Flying Saucer (1950) as Turner
Captain China (1950) as Steve
Singing Guns (1950) as Richards Henchman
Federal Agent at Large (1950) as 'Jumpy' Jordan
Dynamite Pass (1950) as Thurber Henchman
Customs Agent (1950) as Al
The Old Frontier (1950) as Henchman George
Rough Riders of Durango (1951) as Henchman Lacey
Million Dollar Pursuit (1951) as Nick Algren
Drums in the Deep South (1951) as Union Soldier Breaking Window (uncredited)
The Hills of Utah (1951) as Bowie French
Mutiny (1952) as Gunner / Mutineer (uncredited)
Oklahoma Annie (1952) as Skip
Man from the Black Hills (1952) as Glenn Hartley
Desert Passage (1952) as Allen
Fargo (1952) as Carey
Canyon Ambush (1952) as Tom Carlton-Replaced (credit only)
The Maverick (1952) as Bud Karnes
Gunsmoke (1953) as Greasy (uncredited)
Fort Vengeance (1953) as Rider Warning About Wagon Train (uncredited)
A Perilous Journey (1953) as Bartender (uncredited)
The Lone Hand (1953) as Regulator (uncredited)
Rebel City (1953) as Greeley
Column South (1953) as Confederate Spy in Yankee Uniform (uncredited)
Goldtown Ghost Riders (1953) as Bernie Malloy (uncredited)
Topeka (1953) as Jonas Bailey
Vigilante Terror (1953) as Henchman Sperry
Texas Bad Man (1953) as Tench
The Command (1954) as Infantryman (uncredited)
Ride Clear of Diablo (1954) as Reverend Moorehead
The Boy from Oklahoma (1954) as Bagley (uncredited)
Johnny Guitar (1954) as Posseman (uncredited)
Drum Beat (1954) as Fairchild (uncredited)
The Yellow Mountain (1954) as George Yost (uncredited)
The Life and Legend of Wyatt Earp (1955) as Ben Thompson
Ten Wanted Men (1955) as Dave Weed (uncredited)
Rage at Dawn (1955) as Clint Reno
Run for Cover (1955) as Harvey (uncredited)
To Hell and Back (1955) as Thompson
Top Gun (1955) as Hank Spencer (uncredited)
The Millionaire (1956) as Arthur Darner
Please Murder Me (1956) as Lieut. Bradley
I Killed Wild Bill Hickok (1956) as Jim Bailey
The Naked Hills (1956) as Bert Killian / Narrator
Yaqui Drums (1956) as Lefty Barr
7th Cavalry (1956) as Dixon
Gun Duel in Durango (1957) as Ranger Captain
Destination 60,000 (1957) as Mickey Hill
The Lonely Man (1957) as Brad, Red Bluff Sheriff
The Restless Gun (1957) Episode "Rink" as Sheriff
Jet Pilot (1957) as Mr. Simpson (uncredited)
Domino Kid (1957) as Bill Dragger (uncredited)
Have Gun Will Travel (1957) as Clay Sommers (Episode: The Colonel and the Lady) 
The Left Handed Gun (1958) as Ollinger
Fort Massacre (1958) as Collins
China Doll (1958) as Col. Wiley
The Party Crashers (1958) as Ted Bickford
The Restless Gun (1959) Episode "The Pawn"
Good Day for a Hanging (1959) as Deputy Ed Moore
King of the Wild Stallions (1959) as Doc Webber
The Horse Soldiers (1959) as Jackie Jo
Gunsmoke(1959) as Mike Blocker
Bat Masterson (1959) as Dan Morgan
Cast a Long Shadow (1959) as Preacher Harrison
The Rifleman as The Hangman, Seth Mitchell, Henry Trumble, & George Tanner
"Perry Mason (TV Series) | S3, Ep24: The Case of the Ominous Outcast
May 21, 1960"
Home from the Hill (1960) as Mr. Bradley (uncredited)
The Tall Man (1960) Episode "Garrett and the Kid"
The Alamo (1960) as Thimblerig (the Gambler)
Have Gun Will Travel (Episode-Ransom) (1960) as Colonel Celine
Bonanza  (TV series, 1961–1972) as Theodore 'Ted' Hackett / Sheriff Tom Stedman / Marcus Caldwell / Claude Roman / Price Buchanan / Warden / Sheriff Ed (8 episodes)
The Man Who Shot Liberty Valance (1962) as Amos Carruthers
Geronimo (1962) as Senator Conrad
The Dick Van Dyke Show (1963) as Uncle George
Terrified (1963) as Sheriff Dixon
Mail Order Bride (1964) as Preacher Pope
Black Like Me (1964) as Man in pick-up truck
Cheyenne Autumn (1964) as Sen. Henry (uncredited)
The Rounders (1965) as Bull
Mara of the Wilderness (1965) as Kelly
Shenandoah (1965) as Pastor Bjoerling
Tammy (1965–66) as Grandpa Mordecai Tarleton
Gunsmoke(1965) as Cousin Claudius
The Great Race (1965) as Sheriff
Incident at Phantom Hill (1966) as 1st Hunter
Gunpoint (1966) as Cap
Gunsmoke(1966) as Caleb
Gunsmoke(1967) as Dr. Henry S. Rand
Tammy and the Millionaire (1967) as Grandpa Mordecai Tarleton
Welcome to Hard Times (1967) as Alfie — Stage Driver
Bonnie and Clyde (1967) as Frank Hamer
Bandolero! (1968) as Muncie Carter
5 Card Stud (1968) as Sig Evers
Something Big (1971) as Junior Frisbee
The Legend of Hillbilly John (1972) as Grandpappy John
Cahill U.S. Marshal (1973) as Denver
The Life and Times of Grizzly Adams (1977–1978) TV Series, as Mad Jack
Escape to Witch Mountain (1975) as Uncle Bené
The Boy Who Talked to Badgers (1975) as Ben as an Adult
The Adventures of Frontier Fremont (1976) as Big Bill Driggers
Hawmps! (1976) as Col. Seymour Hawkins
Buffalo Bill and the Indians, or Sitting Bull's History Lesson (1976) as The Indian Agent
Welcome to L.A. (1976) as Carl Barber
Guardian of the Wilderness (1976) as Galen Clark
Return from Witch Mountain (1978) as Uncle Bene
Legend of the Northwest (1978) as Abner
How Bugs Bunny Won The West (1978) as The Narrator
The Dukes of Hazzard (1979–1985, TV Series) as Uncle Jesse Duke
Legend of the Wild (1981)
Delta Fever (1987) as Walt
Return to Mayberry (1986, TV movie) as Briscoe Darling
Maverick (1994) as Old Gambler on Riverboat
The Dukes of Hazzard: Reunion! (1997) as Uncle Jesse Duke

Selected television

References

External links

1920 births
1997 deaths
20th-century American male actors
American male film actors
American male television actors
Burials in Texas
Colorado State University alumni
Deaths from lung cancer in California
Male actors from Colorado
Male actors from Los Angeles
Military personnel from Colorado
People from Kit Carson County, Colorado
United States Merchant Mariners
United States Navy personnel of World War II
United States Navy sailors
Western (genre) television actors